The Dolans are living spaceships which the authors of the Perry Rhodan fictional universe introduced in 1967. While the concept of a largely organic spacegoing vessel had been put forward earlier, the Dolan represents the first example of the class of bioengineered, highly integrated combat-capable starships that have become a frequent feature in current science fiction.

In the storyline, the Dolans served as all-purpose vessels and weapons for their commanders, the Oscillation Sentinels (also known as the Second-Conditioned) who were products of the same synthetic biology, designed and bred as agents for their elusive masters, the Prime Oscillation Power. These entities monitored spacetime for the telltale hyperdimensional signatures of temporal experiments, which they regarded as forbidden.

Biology
Unless signatures of causality manipulations were detected, Dolans concealed themselves on remote uninhabited planets and stayed in stasis, resembling a deflated balloon hull. In its active state, a Dolan became a reddish or black and outwardly almost featureless sphere of about 100 meters diameter. Its body consisted mainly of matrix tissue built from structural cells that could adapt to almost any function (including absorption of nutrients) and could undergo multiple rounds of local cell division whenever this was called for; therefore, few dedicated organs were required. Within minutes, this tissue could undergo a solid-phase transformation to harden its structure to a polycristalline steel-like quality. Limited mobility on planetary surfaces could be achieved by growing tentacle-like legs. Completely engulfed by this pluripotent biological matrix were four decks and a central cylinder of 20 meters length. These non-biological internal support structures held the drive unit, power sources, weapons and other equipment that closely interfaced with the Dolan's highly differentiated nervous system and the brain. Dolans were sub-sentient, capable only of instincts and basic emotions, and bonded to their respective commander for absolute loyalty.

To be fully operative, a Dolan needed not only its Oscillation Sentinel but also seven "executors"—individuals from other races who were acquired, enslaved and mentally integrated with the Dolan during missions—to serve on distinct stations: (1) piloting and navigation, (2) flight technology, (3) engineering, (4) communication and scanning, (5) motor functions, (6) weapons, and (7) analysis. Because of the tightness of the integration, an executor who died had to be replaced as soon as possible because grief would all but incapacitate the remaining executors and the Dolan itself.

Offensive potential
When the Solar Empire was first engaged by the Dolans in 2435, it was the dominant military power on this side of the Galactic center and had employed hyperspatial technology for over four centuries. However, its weapons capabilities were no match for the Dolans. Their Paratron converters opened destructive rifts in spacetime, and their force fields (which employed the same technology) deflected incoming energy into hyperspace; they could not be saturated or overloaded by any known weapon. Transform cannons, Terra's most advanced ship-to-ship weapon which teleported gigaton-calibre nuclear warheads into enemy craft, failed to penetrate those shields while Dolan hypermechanical interval cannons could destruct any known object almost regardless of its shielding. The Dolan War pushed mankind to the very brink of survival; the Home System and Earth itself came under heavy attack. Although countermeasures were finally developed and the Empire survived, it was so weakened that many of its provinces subsequently broke away into independence.

References
 Perrypedia article on Dolans (German)

Bioships